Judge O'Neill may refer to:

Lawrence Joseph O'Neill (born 1952), judge of the United States District Court for the Eastern District of California
Thomas Newman O'Neill Jr. (1928–2018), judge of the United States District Court for the Eastern District of Pennsylvania